Peter Drew Hutton (born 1947) is an Australian activist, academic, campaigner and past political candidate. Hutton co-founded the Queensland Greens (in 1990) and Australian Greens (in 1991) and ran in elections in Queensland and Australia at all three levels of government.

Social activist
Hutton has been a social activist all his adult life. "Since 1984 I have been part of the process that has moved green politics from the margins to the mainstream of Australian political life. Along the way I have been privileged to represent the Party as a spokesperson and as a candidate. The Greens are now poised to enter that mainstream as a powerful force, representing the hopes and aspirations of many, many Australians."

Educator
He worked as a high school teacher and then a college lecturer from the 1960s to the 1980s. In the 1970s he joined the anti-Vietnam War campaign and civil liberties campaigns and in the 1980s he was active in the peace movement. Hutton became involved in campaigns on uranium mining, Indigenous land rights and nuclear disarmament. He also used his position as a teacher educator to champion peace and environmental education in schools and more democratic school environments and teaching practices.

For many years, Hutton was a lecturer at tertiary institutions in South East Queensland including Queensland University of Technology (QUT) and University of Southern Queensland. Hutton has published books and numerous articles, especially on green philosophy, history and ethics. He brought together the first book on green politics in Australia in 1987 and with his partner Libby Connors wrote A History of the Australian Environment Movement published by Cambridge University Press in 1999. Hutton and Dr Conners were married in 1986, and have two adult sons.

Organiser
Over the last 29 years Hutton has been a key organiser or spokesperson for campaigns against freeways, the storage and transport of hazardous waste, against evictions of poorer residents in inner-city Brisbane suburbs, nuclear disarmament, public transport and marijuana legalisation. He fought against the Bjelke-Petersen government and ended up in court on many occasions as a result.

Hutton's work against pollution resulted in a 1994 Criminal Justice Commission inquiry into toxic waste dumping in Queensland, an inquiry which highlighted massive problems and led to pressure on the Wayne Goss Government to introduce the Environmental Protection Act. He has been active on many environmental campaigns such as land clearing and was involved in the campaign against the war in Iraq. Hutton's highest vote as a candidate was 25.64% in the ward of The Gabba in the 2008 Brisbane City Council elections.

Lock the Gate Alliance
In June 2011, Hutton was elected president of the Lock the Gate Alliance, an organisation he helped establish the previous year. On 9 December 2011 Hutton was found guilty in the Dalby Magistrates Court of 'obstructing a coal seam gas company without reasonable excuse' under s804 of the Petroleum and Gas Act. 

He was protesting against the Queensland Gas Company entering a property in Queensland's Darling Downs when he was arrested in March of that year. Hutton has seen the Lock the Gate Alliance member base grow to represent over 30,000 individuals and 280 communities nationwide, and has become a regular spokesperson on the impacts of invasive mining activities on agricultural land, water resources, regional communities and ecologically sensitive areas.

See also

 Australian Greens
 2004 Australian Greens candidates

References

Further reading 

   Hutton, Drew. Mining: the Queensland Way / Drew Hutton. At a Glance Pty Ltd, 2013. ISBN: 9780980442328
   Hutton, Drew. “Lessons from the Lock the Gate Movement.” Social Alternatives, vol. 31, no. 1, 2012, pp. 15–19. ISSN: 0155-0306

External links
 Drew Hutton for The Gabba 
 History of the Australian Environment Movement - by Drew Hutton, Libby Connors (Cambridge University Press)
 Queensland Greens - About Us
 Drew Hutton for the Senate (Qld) 14 August 2004
 Drew Hutton's Facebook profile
 Drew Hutton's Myspace profile
 Drew Hutton on Australian Story
 Drew Hutton, how he galvanised the Greens and his unlikely alliance with Alan Jones
 Drew Hutton and Adrian Skerritt: Our radical past: protest in 60s and 70s Brisbane oral history, State Library of Queensland

Living people
1947 births
Australian Greens candidates
Academic staff of Queensland University of Technology
Academic staff of the University of Southern Queensland
Date of birth missing (living people)
Place of birth missing (living people)